is a Japanese individual trampoline gymnast, at international competitions. To date, she has competed in the 2014 and 2015 Trampoline World Championships, and Rio 2016 Summer Olympics.

In 2014, she won the silver medal in the girls' trampoline event at the 2014 Summer Youth Olympics held in Nanjing, China.

Life
Nakano began the sport at age four in Kanazawa, Japan. Her mother sent her to a trampolining class in order to overcome her shy personality.

References

External links
 
 
 

1997 births
Living people
Japanese female trampolinists
Place of birth missing (living people)
Olympic gymnasts of Japan
Gymnasts at the 2014 Summer Youth Olympics
Gymnasts at the 2016 Summer Olympics
21st-century Japanese women